Timbiriche, El concierto is a two-disc live album from Mexican pop music group Timbiriche. It was released in 1999. The album is a live recording from their reunion in 1999. The album was certified Platinum + Gold by AMPROFON for sales of over 350,000.

Track listing
CD 1

 "TIMBIRICHE" 
 "SOMOS AMIGOS" 
 "JUNTOS" 
 "SOLO TU SOLO YO"
 "ROCK Medley (Concierto de Rock/Telefono/Me Planto/Mickey)"
 "PRINCESA TIBETANA" (featuring Erik)
 "SI NO ES AHORA" (featuring Erik & Paulina)
 "ADIOS A LA ESCUELA" (featuring Benny, Alix & Mariana)
 "BAILE DEL SAPO" 
 "GREASE Medley" 
 "PAYASOS" (featuring Alix & Mariana)
 "MAMA" (featuring Benny)
 "MIRAME" (featuring Alix)

CD 2

 "MURIENDO LENTO" (featuring Sasha & Benny)
 "SOY UN DESASTRE" (featuring Diego)
 "ACELERAR" (featuring Paulina)
 "AMAME HASTA CON LOS DIENTES" (featuring Erik)
 "BESOS DE CENIZA" (featuring Mariana)
 "TU Y YO SOMOS UNO MISMO" (featuring Diego)
 "LA VIDA ES MEJOR CANTANDO" (featuring Sasha)
 "CON TODOS MENOS CONMIGO" (featuring Erik, Diego & Benny) 
 "HOY TENGO QUE DECIRTE PAPA" 
 "CORRO VUELO ME ACELERO" (featuring Mariana, Alix, Paulina & Sasha)
 "LA BANDA TIMBIRICHE"
 "MEXICO" (featuring Mariana & Paulina)
 "ESTA DESPIERTO"
 "SUMA COSMICA"
 "LA FUERZA DEL AMOR"

References

1999 albums
Timbiriche albums